TDM-GCC is a compiler suite for Microsoft Windows. It is a commonly recommended compiler in many books, both for beginners and more experienced programmers.

It combines the most recent stable release of the GCC toolset, a few patches for Windows-friendliness, and the free and open-source MinGW runtime APIs to create an open-source alternative to Microsoft's compiler and platform SDK. It is able to build 32-bit or 64-bit binaries, for any version of Windows since Windows 98.

TDM-GCC is a redistribution of components that are freely available elsewhere. A large difference is that it changes the default GCC libraries to be statically linked, and use a shared memory region for exception handling.

IDE's that come bundled with TDM-GCC
 Code::Blocks
 Dev-C++

References

External links 
 TDM-GCC website (redirects to https://jmeubank.github.io/tdm-gcc/)

Compilers